The 2021–22 season was the 115th season in the existence of Sevilla and the club's 21st consecutive season in the top flight of Spanish football. In addition to the domestic league, Sevilla also participated in this season's editions of the Copa del Rey, the UEFA Champions League and the UEFA Europa League.

Players
As of 30 August 2021.

Transfers and loans

Transfers In

Transfers Out

Loans In

Loans Out

Pre-season and friendlies

Competitions

Overall record

La Liga

League table

Results summary

Results by round

Matches
The league fixtures were announced on 30 June 2021.

Copa del Rey

UEFA Champions League

Group stage

The draw for the group stage was held on 26 August 2021.

UEFA Europa League

Knockout phase

Knockout round play-offs
The knockout round play-offs draw was held on 13 December 2021.

Round of 16
The draw for the round of 16 was held on 25 February 2022.

Statistics

Squad appearances and goals

|-
! colspan=14 style=background:#dcdcdc; text-align:center|Goalkeepers

|-
! colspan=14 style=background:#dcdcdc; text-align:center|Defenders

|-
! colspan=14 style=background:#dcdcdc; text-align:center|Midfielders

|-
! colspan=14 style=background:#dcdcdc; text-align:center|Forwards

|-
! colspan=14 style=background:#dcdcdc; text-align:center|Players who have made an appearance this season but have left the club

|}

Goalscorers

Clean sheets

Disciplinary record

Includes all competitive matches.

References

Sevilla FC seasons
Sevilla
Sevilla
Sevilla